

Gmina Brańsk  is a rural gmina (Polish:gmina wiejska) in Bielsk County, Podlaskie Voivodeship. It is located in north-eastern Poland.

Etymology 
The name Brańsk comes from the river Bronka, a nearby tributary of the Nurzec River.

Geography 
Gmina Brańsk is located in the geographical region of Europe known as the Wysoczyzny Podlasko – Białoruskie (Podlaskie and Belarus Plateau) and the mezoregion known as the Równina Bielska (Bielska Plain).

Location 
It is located approximately: 
  north-east of Warsaw, the capital of Poland
  south-west of Białystok, the capital of the Podlaskie Voivodeship
  west of Bielsk Podlaski, the seat of Bielsk County

Climate 
The region has a continental climate which is characterized by high temperatures during summer and long and frosty winters . The average amount of rainfall during the year exceeds .

Rivers 
Three rivers pass through the Gmina:
 The Nurzec River, a tributary of the Bug River
 The Siennica River, a tributary of the Nurzec River
 The Czarna River, a tributary of the Nurzec River

Demographics 
Detailed data as of 31 December 2007:

Municipal government 

Its seat is the town of Brańsk, although the town is not part of the territory of the gmina.

Executive branch 
The chief executive of the government is the mayor (Polish: wójt).

Legislative branch 
The legislative portion of the government is the Council (Polish: Rada) composed of the President (Polish: Przewodniczący), the Vice President (Polish: Wiceprzewodniczący) and thirteen councilors.

Villages 
The following villages are contained within the gmina:

Bronka, Brzeźnica, Burchaty, Chojewo, Chojewo-Kolonia, Chrościanka, Dębowo, Domanowo, Ferma, Glinnik, Holonki, Jarmarkowszczyzna, Kadłubówka, Kalnica, Kalnowiec, Kiersnowo, Kiersnówek, Kiewłaki, Klichy, Konotopa, Koszewo, Lubieszcze, Majerowizna, Markowo, Mień, Nowosady, Oleksin, Olędy, Olędzkie, Olszewek, Olszewo, Otapy, Pace, Pasieka, Patoki, Pietraszki, Płonowo, Poletyły, Popławy, Pruszanka Stara, Pruszanka-Baranki, Puchały Nowe, Puchały Stare, Spieszyn, Szmurły, Ściony, Świrydy, Widźgowo, Załuskie Koronne, Załuskie Kościelne, Zanie.

Neighbouring political subdivisions 
Gmina Brańsk is bordered by the town of Brańsk and the Gminy of Bielsk Podlaski, Boćki, Dziadkowice, Grodzisk, Klukowo, Nowe Piekuty, Poświętne, Rudka, Szepietowo and Wyszki.

Transport

Roads and Highways 
Gmina Brańsk is at the intersection of a National Road and a Voivodeship Road:

 National Road 66  - Zambrów - Brańsk - Bielsk Podlaski - Kleszczele - Czeremcha - Połowce Border Crossing (Belarus)
 Voivodeship Road 681  - Roszki-Wodźki - Łapy - Brańsk - Ciechanowiec

Public Transport

Bus Service 
Regular bus service is provided in the town of Brańsk by Państwowa Komunikacja Samochodowa (State Car Communication, PKS) via PKS Bielsk Podlaskie, PKS Białystok and PKS Siemiatycze

Rail Service 
The closest passenger train service is provided by Polskie Koleje Państwowe (Polish State Railways, PKP) SA from the following stations:

Nearby Attractions 

References 

Bransk
Bielsk County